Gadegudur is a village in Kadapa district of the Indian state of Andhra Pradesh. It is located in Rajupalem mandal of Proddatur constitution and Jammalamadugu division.

References 

Villages in Kadapa district